Santisukia is a genus of flowering plants belonging to the family Bignoniaceae.

It is native to Thailand.

The genus name of Santisukia is in honour of Thawatchai Santisuk (b. 1944), a Thai herbarium director in Bangkok. 
It was first described and published in Kew Bull. Vol.47 on page 436 in 1992.

Know species
According to Kew:
Santisukia kerrii 
Santisukia pagetii

References

Bignoniaceae
Bignoniaceae genera
Plants described in 1992
Flora of Thailand